Delph railway station served the village of Delph, Oldham, in what is now Greater Manchester, United Kingdom, between 1851 and 1955.

History

The station closed on 2 May 1955, when the Delph Donkey passenger train service from Oldham to Delph via Greenfield was withdrawn. The station building (complete with platform) still survives as a private residence, now much hemmed in by later development.

For a period after closure, the station yard became home to a small, privately owned collection of railway rolling stock, including two steam locomotives. The locomotives were a Hunslet  Darfield No.1, built in 1953, and a Hunslet 0-6-0ST Brookes No. 1, built in 1941. Other stock consisted of a British Railways Mark 1 bogie coach, an oil tank wagon and a goods brake van. Both locomotives have gone on to enjoy useful lives on preserved lines, but the coach and wagons were cut up on site.

One of the major features of the station was the Bailey Mill, located adjacent to the station building. The mill had been derelict since ceasing production in 1996. Evidence of the railway line still existed in front of the mill. The mill was gutted by fire in 2016 and was subsequently demolished. A 16-year-old boy was arrested on suspicion of arson.

References

An Illustrated History of Oldham's Railways by John Hooper
steam '76, the official Association of Railway Preservation Societies Year Book & Steam Guide 1976

External links
Delph Station on navigable O.S. map

Disused railway stations in the Metropolitan Borough of Oldham
Former London and North Western Railway stations
Railway stations in Great Britain opened in 1851
Railway stations in Great Britain closed in 1955
1851 establishments in England
Saddleworth